Manaka Kubota  (born 9 July 1996) is a Japanese sprint canoer. 

She qualified at the 2020 Summer Olympics, in the C-1 200 meters, and C-2 500 meters. 

She competed at the 2018 ICF Canoe Sprint World Championships, and at the 2019 and 2021 Canoe Sprint World Cup.

References

External links 
 Manaka Kubota Teruko Kiriake (JPN), AUGUST 30, 2018 Canoe Sprint Women s Canoe Double 500m Final at (imago-images.com)

1996 births
Living people
Japanese female canoeists
Canoeists at the 2020 Summer Olympics
Olympic canoeists of Japan
Canoeists at the 2018 Asian Games
Sportspeople from Tokyo Metropolis
People from Kiyose, Tokyo
Nippon Sport Science University alumni
Asian Games competitors for Japan